The Ven. John Hall (1626-1691) was a Church of Ireland priest in the  17th century and early 18th century.

An Englishman, Hall was educated at Trinity College, Dublin. He was ordained on 31 March 1667. In 1667 he became Archdeacon of Killaloe and in 1668 Precentor of Leighlin.

Notes

1626 births
1691 deaths
Archdeacons of Killaloe
17th-century Irish Anglican priests
18th-century Irish Anglican priests
Alumni of Trinity College Dublin
Christian clergy from Dublin (city)